Lost Generation was the second major label album by singer-songwriter Elliott Murphy produced by Paul A. Rothchild and recorded at Elektra Studio in Los Angeles and was reviewed by Paul Nelson in Rolling Stone. The album featured an all-star band of top session musicians including drummer Jim Gordon and keyboardist Richard Tee. The cover photo of Murphy standing in front of an open parachute was taken by photographer Ed Caraeff. Paul Nelson's Rolling Stone review called the album "brilliant but extraordinarily difficult" and gave Murphy the Hemingwayesque accolade, "When he's on the street, the sun also rises on one of the best."

Track listing
All tracks composed by Elliott Murphy

"Hollywood"
"A Touch of Mercy"
"History"
"When You Ride"
"Bittersweet"
"Lost Generation"
"Eva Braun"
"Manhattan Rock"
"Visions of the Night"
"Lookin' Back"

Personnel
Elliott Murphy – vocals, guitar, harmonica, keyboards
Richard Tee – piano
Wayne DeVillier – keyboards
Jim Gordon – drums, percussion
Ned Doheny  – guitar
Sonny Landreth – guitar
Jackie Clark – guitar
Bobby Kimball – harmony vocals
Gordon Edwards – bass
Jon Smith – saxophone
Technical
Fritz Richmond – engineer
Acy Lehman – art direction
Dennis Katz – cover design
Ed Caraeff – photography

References

1975 albums
Elliott Murphy albums
Albums produced by Paul A. Rothchild
RCA Records albums